Hellinsia varioides is a moth of the family Pterophoridae. It is found in North America, including California.

The wingspan is 20–24 mm. The forewings are unicolorous pale greyish white. The costal
edge in the basal half is (at times) narrowly brownish. The hindwings are pale greyish
with faintly smoky fringes.

References

varioides
Moths of North America
Fauna of California
Moths described in 1939
Taxa named by James Halliday McDunnough